Judith Deborah Rakers (born 6 January 1976) is a German journalist and television presenter.

Biography 

Rakers was born in Paderborn, West Germany, and grew up in Bad Lippspringe with her single father. After graduating at Pelizaeus-Gymnasium Paderborn, from 1995 to 2001 she studied journalism and communication studies, German philology and modern and contemporary history at the University of Münster. In parallel, she worked as a radio presenter at the radio stations Radio Hochstift and Antenne Münster.

From January 2004 to 17 January 2010, Rakers presented the Hamburg Journal for local TV station Norddeutscher Rundfunk.

Since 2005, Rakers presents the Tagesschau news programme on ARD, as well as reading the news in the Tagesthemen, Nachtmagazin and Morgenmagazin. In addition to the Tagesschau, Rakers also presents Radio Bremen's talk show 3 nach 9. On 14 May 2011 she hosted the Eurovision Song Contest 2011 in Düsseldorf, Germany, together with Stefan Raab and Anke Engelke.

References

External links

 Judith Rakers' official website

1976 births
Living people
German television actresses
German voice actresses
German television reporters and correspondents
German broadcast news analysts
German television talk show hosts
German women television journalists
21st-century German journalists
People from Paderborn
University of Münster alumni
ARD (broadcaster) people
Norddeutscher Rundfunk people
Radio Bremen people
Tagesschau (ARD) presenters and reporters
21st-century German women